Knut Gravråk (born 15 May 1985) is a Norwegian politician for the Labour Party.

He served as a deputy representative to the Norwegian Parliament from Sør-Trøndelag during the terms 2005–2009 and 2009–2013. In total he met during 328 days of parliamentary session.

On the local level he has been a member of Melhus municipality council.

References

1985 births
Living people
Deputy members of the Storting
Labour Party (Norway) politicians
Sør-Trøndelag politicians
Place of birth missing (living people)
21st-century Norwegian politicians